Saudi Arabia and Yemen relations refers to the current and historical relationship between the neighbouring sovereign states of Saudi Arabia and Yemen. The two countries at one time did enjoy good relations and closely cooperated in military, economic and cultural issues. Now because of the ongoing Yemeni Civil War and the realignments of power in the Middle East with the emergence of al-Qaeda and the radicalization of some factions of Islam, Saudi Arabia has led a military intervention into Yemen.

History

Modern Saudi-Yemeni relations began in 1803 with an attack by Saudi forces of the territory of Zaydi Imamate with the help of some local Yemeni tribes. The Saudis won and had control over the Tihama region until 1818 when the forces of the Ottoman khedive of Egypt, Mohammed Ali Pasha, destroyed the Saudi state.

The establishment of a protectorate over the Idrisi sultanate in Asir led to clashes between Ibn Saud and imam Yahya of Yemen. Ibn Saud captured Asir and Jizan while the imam managed to occupy the oasis of Najran. Negotiations proved fruitless, the Saudis regained control over Najran and occupied about 100 kilometers of the coastal plain In 1948, Saudi Arabia provided aid to Imam Ahmed fearing the "constitutional" nature of an uprising in Yemen.

In 1934, the Saudi–Yemeni War broke out with a Yemeni invasion, responded by strong Saudi offensive. The war ended with Yemen relinquished control of three modern Saudi provinces, Asir, Jizan and Najran. Since then, the two countries have always had a complicated relationship.

Tensions with Saleh Government
Ali Abdullah Saleh served as president of North Yemen, and then a united Yemen between 1978 and 2012. Over these three fraught decades, Yemen's relationship with Saudi Arabia oscillated between low points like Saleh's siding with Saddam Hussein during the first Gulf War, to deepening Saudi sponsorship during the first decade of the War On Terror.

Saleh's falling out of Saudi favor was a contributing factor to his fall from power in 2012. His attempt to regain power by allying with the Houthis, who he had once used the Saudi Air Force to bomb, eventually led to his assassination in December 2017.

Border

In September 2003, in an effort by the Saudi government to control incursions by Yemenis into Saudi Arabia and slow terrorist actions, the Saudis began construction of a wall of cement-filled pipeline,  in diameter along its border with Yemen. Following complaints by the Yemeni government to the Saudis that construction of the wall violated a year 2000 treaty between the two nations, the Saudis stopped work on the wall in February 2004. But by that time,  of cement-filled barrier, of the  border had been erected.

See also
List of ambassadors of Saudi Arabia to Yemen
Saudi Arabia–Yemen border

References

Bibliography
Gause, F. Gregory, (1990), Saudi-Yemeni Relations: Domestic Structures and Foreign Influence, Columbia University Press, .

 
Bilateral relations of Yemen
Yemen